Im Sa-hong (1445–1506) was a Korean scholar official and member of the royal family of Joseon Dynasty. He was a close minister of King Yeonsangun of Joseon. His courtesy name was Yiui (이의).

Family 
 Great-Great-Grandfather 
 Im Gun-bo (임군보)
 Great-Great-Grandmother 
 Lady Park of the Goseong Park clan (고성 박씨)
 Great-Grandfather 
 Im Geo-gyeong (임거경, 任巨卿)
 Grandfather 
 Im Gyeon (임견, 任肩)
 Father 
 Im Won-jun (임원준, 任元濬) (1423 - 1500 or 1506)
 Mother
 Lady Nam of the Uiryeong Nam clan (정경부인 의령 남씨)
 Grandfather - Nam Gyu (남규, 南珪)
 Grandmother - Lady Park of the Miryang Park clan (밀양 박씨)
 Uncle - Nam Chi-shin (남치신, 南致信)
 Aunt - Lady Ha of the Jinju Ha clan (진주 하씨)
 Cousin - Nam Po (남포, 南褒) (1459 - 1540)
 Cousin - Nam Gon (남곤, 南袞) (1471 - 10 March 1527)
 Sibling(s)
 Younger brother - Im Sa-yeong (임사영)
 Wife and issue
 Lady Yi of the Jeonju Yi clan (전주 이씨); daughter of Yi Gab, Prince Boseong (보성군 갑, 寶城君) (1416 - 1499)
 Son - Im Gwang-hae (임광재, 任光載) (? - 1495)
 Daughter-in-law - Princess Hyeonsuk (현숙공주) (1464 - 1502)
 Son - Im Hui-jae (임희재, 任熙載) (1472 - 1504)
 Daughter-in-law - Gu Sun-bok (구순복, 具順福), Lady Gu of the Neungseong Gu clan (능성 구씨, 綾城 具氏)
 Granddaughter - Lady Im of the Pungcheon Im clan (풍천 임씨, 豊川 任氏)
 Grandson-in-law - Shin Hong-jo (신홍조, 愼弘祚)(1490 - ?)
 Great-Grandson - Shin Sa-heon (신사헌, 愼思獻) (1520 - ?)
 Son - Im Mun-jae (임문재, 任文載)
 Son - Im Song-jae (임숭재, 任崇載) (? - 1505)
 Daughter-in-law - Princess Hwisuk (휘숙옹주)
 Granddaughter - Lady Im of the Pungcheon Im clan (풍천 임씨, 豊川 任氏)
 Granddaughter - Lady Im of the Pungcheon Im clan (풍천 임씨, 豊川 任氏)
 Granddaughter - Lady Im of the Pungcheon Im clan (풍천 임씨, 豊川 任氏)
 Daughter - Lady Im of the Pungcheon Im clan (풍천 임씨, 豊川 任氏)
 Daughter - Lady Im of the Pungcheon Im clan (풍천 임씨, 豊川 任氏)
 Son-in-law - No Jung (노종, 盧種)

Popular culture

Drama 
 Portrayed by Shin Chung-sik in the 1984-1985 MBC TV series Snow Matchmaker
 Portrayed by Ahn Byeong-gyeong in the 1994 KBS TV series Han Myeong-hoe
 Portrayed by Lee Yeong-hu in the 1995 KBS TV series Jang Nok-su
 Portrayed by Im Hyeok in the 1998-2000 KBS TV series The King and the Queen
 Portrayed by Im Byeong-gi in the 2007-2008 SBS TV series The King and I
 Portrayed by Park Seung-ho in the 2011-2012 JTBC TV series Queen Insu
 Portrayed by Kang Shin-il in the 2017 KBS2 TV series Queen for Seven Days

Film 
 Portrayed by Cheon Ho-jin in the 2015 film The Treacherous

See also 
 Yeonsangun of Joseon
 Nam Gon

Notes

References 

Korean diplomats
Korean Confucianists
Korean educators
Korean Confucianism
Korean scholars
1445 births
1506 deaths
15th-century Korean people
16th-century Korean people
Pungcheon Im clan